Sardar Gujjar Singh Bhangi (died early 1790; alternatively spelt as Gurja or Gujar) was a Sikh warrior of the Bhangi Misl, and one of the triumvirates who ruled over Lahore prior to the leadership of Maharaja Ranjit Singh.

Bhangi hailed from a village near Khemkaran, India. He, along with his three brothers, was baptised to Sikhism in his teenage by his maternal grandfather Gurbakhsh Singh. He established a fortress, Qila Gujar Singh, just east of present-day Lahore, and also completed the construction of a mosque.

Gujjar Singh's maternal grandfather was Sardar Gurbaksh Singh of village Roranwala in Amritsar (near the Wagah border) and his mother daughter of Gurbaksh, one of the greatest Sikh warriors under the Bhangi Misl then led by Sardar Hari Singh Bhangi.

Sardar Gurbaksh Singh had adopted as his son a young runaway, Sardar Lehna Singh Kahlon of village Mustfapur, near Kartarpur, Jalandhar (Sir Leppel Griffin, the Panjab Chiefs). The young man grew up to be a great fighter and military commander of the Bhangi Misl.

Gujar and his adopted uncle split Gurbaksh Singh's inheritance of 40 villages taking half each, with Lehna keeping Roranwala and Gujar founding a new village rangarh in amritsar where his descendents may be found.

The two sardars took Lahore in 1765, with Lehna taking Lahore Fort and Gujar building his own fort Qila Gujar Singh in his part of the city – a third share was given to Sardar Soba Singh Sandhu of village Kanha known as Kanhaiya (same village as Jai Singh Kanhaiya of the Kanhaiya Misl).

Lehna Singh Kahlon was to take Multan in 1772, but Gujar being much more restless and a great warrior embarked on conquest of north west Punjab taking towns such as Gujrat (his main residence) as well as Rawalpindi and many towns to Attock, some places he conquered with help of his best friend Sardar Charat Singh Sukarchakia, grandfather of Maharaja Ranjit Singh, with whom he contracted a marriage alliance with his second son Sahib marrying Charat's daughter, Raj Kaur.

See also 

 Sikh period in Lahore

Notes

References

Further reading

History of Sikhism
People of the Sikh Empire